Nadia Marchi (born 7 February 1963) is a Sammarinese sports shooter. She competed in the women's 10 metre air pistol event at the 1996 Summer Olympics.

References

1963 births
Living people
Sammarinese female sport shooters
Olympic shooters of San Marino
Shooters at the 1996 Summer Olympics
Place of birth missing (living people)